Give Us the Money is a 2012 documentary film made by the Swedish director Bosse Lindquist. The film is produced by Momento Film and is a part of the cross media project Why Poverty?

The film explores the Live Aid campaign that Bono and Bob Geldof started 1985. With the film Lindquist wants to examine if charity from celebrities really can fight poverty.

References

External links

Why Poverty?

2012 films
2012 documentary films
Documentary films about poverty
Swedish documentary films